Jannatabad or Jenatabad may refer to:

Bengal
 Jannatabad, a historical town also called Gauḍa, in Bengal

Iran

Hamadan Province
Jannatabad, Hamadan, a village in Asadabad County

Hormozgan Province
Jannatabad, Hormozgan

Kerman Province
Jannatabad, Arzuiyeh, a village in Arzuiyeh County
Jannatabad, Manujan, a village in Manujan County
Jannatabad, Narmashir, a village in Narmashir County
Jannatabad, Rafsanjan, a village in Rafsanjan County
Jannatabad, Ferdows, a village in Rafsanjan County
Jannatabad, Rigan, a village in Rigan County
Jannatabad 1, a village in Sirjan County

Qazvin Province
Jannatabad, Buin Zahra, Qazvin Province
Jannatabad, Qazvin

Qom Province
Jannatabad, Qom

Razavi Khorasan Province
Jannatabad, Khoshab, a village in Khoshab County
Jannatabad, Mahvelat, a village in Mahvelat County
Jannatabad-e Jangal, a village in Rashtkhvar County
Jannatabad, Torbat-e Jam, a village in Torbat-e Jam County
Jannatabad Rural District, an administrative subdivision of Torbat-e Jam County

Semnan Province
Jannatabad, Semnan, a village in Garmsar County

South Khorasan Province
Jannatabad, Qaen, South Khorasan Province
Jannatabad, Sarbisheh, South Khorasan Province
Jannatabad, Mud, South Khorasan Province

Tehran Province
Jannat Abad, a neighbourhood of Tehran